Jay McDonagh (born February 7, 1973) is a former American football quarterback who played four seasons in the Arena Football League with the Buffalo Destroyers, New Jersey/Las Vegas Gladiators and Columbus Destroyers. He played college football at Western Michigan University. He was also a member of the Bologna Phoenix, Green Bay Bombers, Madison Mad Dogs, Quad City Steamwheelers, Colorado Crush and Bologna Warriors.

Early years and college career
McDonagh attended Gordon Technical High School in Chicago, Illinois.

McDonagh played college football for the Western Michigan Broncos. He was a two-time All-Conference selection at Western Michigan and three-time team MVP. He earned All-Mid-American Conference second team honors in 1995. McDonagh recorded career totals of 529 completions for 892 attempts, 6,148 yards and 45 touchdowns.

Statistics

Source:

Professional career

Bologna Phoenix
McDonagh played for the Bologna Phoenix in Italy during the 1997 season. The Phoenix advanced to the Italian Super Bowl while McDonagh was voted as league and team MVP.

Green Bay Bombers
McDonagh played for the Green Bay Bombers of the Professional Indoor Football League in 1998. He was named Offensive Player of the Year and an All-Star after throwing for 56 touchdowns.

Buffalo Destroyers
McDonagh was a backup quarterback for the Buffalo Destroyers in 1999. He was briefly traded the Carolina Cobras in March 2000 but the transaction was voided.

Madison Mad Dogs
McDonagh played for the Madison Mad Dogs of the Indoor Football League in 2000. He earned All-League honors while helping his team to an 11–6 record. In defeat of the Billings Thunderbolts, he completed 18 of 37 passes for 172 yards and 5 touchdowns. In a victory against the Minnesota Purple Rage, McDonagh completed 15 of 23 passes for 4 touchdowns and 199 yards.

Quad City Steamwheelers
McDonagh played for the Quad City Steamwheelers of the af2 in 2001. He played in 15 games, finishing with a quarterback rating of 131.9. He completed 303 of 424 pass attempts for 73 touchdowns and seven interceptions during the season. McDonagh averaged 254.8 passing yards per game and helped the team to their second championship by winning ArenaCup II. He threw for 280 yards and three touchdowns in the ArenaCup victory over the Richmond Speed.

New Jersey/Las Vegas Gladiators
McDonagh signed with the New Jersey Gladiators in November 2001. He played for the Gladiators from 2002 to 2003, recording 107 touchdowns on 6,357 passing yards.

Colorado Crush
McDonagh signed with the Colorado Crush in November 2003. He was released by the Crush on January 29, 2004.

Columbus Destroyers
McDonagh was signed by the Columbus Destroyers' practice squad on April 2, 2004. He was promoted to the active roster on April 6, 2004.

Bologna Warriors
McDonagh played for the Bologna Warriors in Italy during the 2005 season. The Warriors advanced to the Italian Super Bowl but they lost to Bergamo Lions 42–14.

AFL statistics

Stats from ArenaFan:

References

External links
Just Sports Stats
College stats

Living people
1973 births
Players of American football from Chicago
American football quarterbacks
Western Michigan Broncos football players
Buffalo Destroyers players
Quad City Steamwheelers players
New Jersey Gladiators players
Las Vegas Gladiators players
Columbus Destroyers players
Colorado Crush players